The Congolese ambassador in France is the official representative of the Government of the Democratic Republic of the Congo to the Government of France.

List of representatives

References 

Ambassadors of the Democratic Republic of the Congo to France
France
Congo Democratic Republic of the